Radha Kumud Mukherjee (also spelled Radhakumud or Radha Kumud Mookerji and also known as Radha Kumud Mukhopadhyaya; 25 January 1884 – 9 September 1963) was an Indian historian and a noted Indian nationalist during the period of British colonial rule. He was the brother of the sociologist Radhakamal Mukerjee.

Career
Mukherjee obtained a doctorate from the University of Calcutta in 1905 and joined the newly established National Council of Education, teaching at the Bengal National College. After 1915, he embarked on a series of tenures at universities in Benares, Mysore, and Lucknow.

He published Indian Shipping:  A History of Seaborne Trade and Maritime Activity of the Indians from the Earliest Times in 1912.  He was an advocate of the notion of Greater India in which Indian merchants and adventurers with huge fleets brought Indians to Southeast Asia and became the foundation of kingdoms in that region.

He was awarded the Padma Bhushan in 1957 for his contribution to Public Affairs.

Bibliography

Books by Radha Kumud Mukherjee:
 Indian Shipping:  A History of Seaborne Trade and Maritime Activity of the Indians from the Earliest Times
 Ancient Indian Education: Brahmanical and Buddhist (1947), reprinted by Motilal Banarsidass (1960).
 Men and Thought in Ancient India (1912) McMillan and co., reprinted by Motilal Banarsidass (1996).
 The Fundamental Unity of India
 A History of India
 Chandragupta Maurya and His Times
 Early History of Kausambi
 Local Government in Ancient India
 Nationalism in Hindu Culture
 The University of Nalanda

References

20th-century Indian historians
Nominated members of the Rajya Sabha
Recipients of the Padma Bhushan in public affairs
1884 births
1964 deaths
University of Calcutta alumni
Academic staff of Banaras Hindu University
Academic staff of the University of Mysore
Academic staff of the University of Lucknow
Writers from West Bengal